Fengyan Township is a township under the administration of Nanchuan District, Chongqing, China. , it administers the following seven villages:
Qianqiu Village
Fengzhong Village
Fengsheng Village
Zhengyang Village
Jinxing Village
Sanjiao Village
Fengyun Village

References 

Township-level divisions of Chongqing